William Evans Colvin (26 January 1858, Co. Limerick–30 September 1949, Brighton) was an Anglican priest in Ireland in the late nineteenth and early 20th centuries.

Colvin was educated at Trinity College, Dublin and ordained in 1890. He served curacies in Killoran, Didsbury and Wotton, Surrey. He was the incumbent at Dromard from 1895 to 1926 and Archdeacon of Killala from 1911 until 1928 when he became Dean of Killala.

Notes

External links
 

Alumni of Trinity College Dublin
19th-century Irish Anglican priests
20th-century Irish Anglican priests
Archdeacons of Killala
Deans of Killala
1858 births
1949 deaths